Urlakulapadu is a village in Rajavommangi Mandal, Alluri Sitharama Raju district in the state of Andhra Pradesh in India.

Geography 

Demographics 
 India census, Urlakulapadu had a population of 794, out of which 403 were male and 391 were female. The population of children below 6 years of age was 12%. The literacy rate of the village was 46%.

References 

Villages in Rajavommangi mandal